The Jacobs Aircraft Engine Company was an American aircraft engine manufacturer that existed from 1926 to 1956.

History

Early years
The Jacobs Aircraft Engine Company was formed in 1926 in Philadelphia. Later the company moved to Pottstown, Pennsylvania after purchasing the machine workshop of the Light Manufacturing and Foundry Company.

Early engines

An early product was the 1931 L-3, a   three-cylinder air-cooled radial engine. Only 44 were built.

It was better known as by its military designation, R-755. At the time it became known as the best producer of engines in the 200-400 horsepower range. Jacobs was the first to start making engines using forged aluminum alloy pistons, sodium-filled exhaust valves, and magnesium alloy crankcases.

The L-4 was used mostly on the Cessna Bobcat, Cessna 195, and Stearman Kaydet.
 
Due to the tendency of the L-4 engine to vibrate heavily at low rpm, it was given the nicknames Shakin' Jake and Shakey Jake.

Later models
Later developments included the 285 hp L-5 or R-830, and 330 hp L-6 or R-915.

Postwar
Jacobs was acquired by Republic Industries in 1945, which was in turn acquired by Barium Steel Corporation in 1946. However in 1947, the company was sold back to Albert Jacobs. Jacobs Aircraft Engines went into default in 1950 and was again sold back to Republic. Finally, Barium sold the company in December 1956 and it closed a few months later in 1957.

Applications

Jacobs engines were fitted to many US-built aircraft of the inter-war period, including several Waco models. They were in use in 26 different countries including in Canada, where 330 horsepower L6-MB engines were used to power the Royal Canadian Air Force's Avro Anson Mk. II aircraft.
In 1941 the American War Department gave the contract to Jacobs to produce Pratt & Whitney R-985 and R-1340 engines until 1945. Jacobs ranked 87th among United States corporations in the value of World War II military production contracts.

Products

See also
 Franklin Engine Company
 List of aircraft engine manufacturers
 List of aircraft engines

References

Manufacturing companies established in 1929
Manufacturing companies based in Philadelphia
Defunct aircraft engine manufacturers of the United States
1929 establishments in Pennsylvania